Xavier Barcons Jáuregui is a Spanish physicist and astronomer appointed as ESO director general from 1 September 2017.

On 29 May 2018, the asteroid 327943 Xavierbarcons was named in his honor.

See also
 European Southern Observatory

References

1959 births
Living people
21st-century Spanish astronomers
Spanish physicists
European Southern Observatory